Take away refers to food prepared in a restaurant to be eaten elsewhere.

Take Away or Takeaway may also refer to:

Film and television
Take Away (film), a 2003 film
 "Takeaway" (Bluey), an episode of the first season of the animated TV series Bluey
"Take Away" (The Professionals), a 1980 television episode
 The Takeaways, a fictional band in the Australian TV series Sweet and Sour

Music
Take Away / The Lure of Salvage, a 1980 album by Andy Partridge
"Take Away" (song), by Missy Elliott
 Takeaway (song), by The Chainsmokers

Other uses
The Takeaway, a news radio program
Takeaway.com, a Dutch food ordering website

See also
 Subtraction, the act of which may be referred to as "take away"
Taken Away, a 1989 American television film starring Valerie Bertinelli
Take It Away (disambiguation)
Take out (disambiguation)
 Turnover (basketball)
 Turnover (football)